Min people may refer to:

Speakers of Min Chinese, a variety of Chinese originating in Fujian province
The people of Minyue, an ancient Baiyue kingdom in present-day Fujian from which Min Chinese gets its name
Mountain Ok people, otherwise known as the Min people of Sandaun Province of Papua New Guinea